Country Dance  is a 1970 British drama film directed by J. Lee Thompson and starring Peter O'Toole, Susannah York and Michael Craig. It is based on the novel Household Ghosts (1961) by James Kennaway which became a three-act stage play in 1967. It was released as Brotherly Love in the United States.

The film's sets were designed by the art director Maurice Fowler. Shooting took place in Perthshire and County Wicklow.

Synopsis
A tragicomedy set in a fading Scottish aristocratic family, in which the drunken Sir Charles Henry Arbuthnot Pinkerton Ferguson, Bt (Peter O'Toole) has an incestuous relationship with his equally eccentric sister Hilary Dow (Susannah York).

Cast
 Peter O'Toole as Sir Charles Ferguson
 Susannah York as Hilary Dow
 Michael Craig as Douglas Dow
 Harry Andrews as Brigadier Crieff
 Cyril Cusack as Dr. Maitland
 Judy Cornwell as Rosie
 Brian Blessed as Jack Baird
 Robert Urquhart as Auctioneer
 Mark Malicz as Benny-the-Pole
 Jean Anderson as Matron
 Lennox Milne as Miss Mailer
 Helena Gloag as Auntie Belle

Production
The stage play version played at the Edinburgh Festival in 1967. James Kennard wrote the female lead with Susannah York in mind; she was a cousin. Edward Fox played the male lead on stage.

In December 1968 James Kennaway, author of the novel, was driving home from a meeting Peter O'Toole to discuss the film version when he died in a car accident.

In February 1969 it was announced O'Toole would make the film with Susannah York under the direction of J. Lee Thompson.

Filming took place in Ireland in mid 1969. York said "it was the happiest film experience of my life." O'Toole drank heavily through the shoot and at one stage was arrested. Brian Blessed recalled it as "a delightful experience" but admits O'Toole could be difficult.

At one point the film was called The Same Skin. Then it was changed to Brotherly Love.

In April 1970 producer Robert Ginna announced he would make another film with O'Toole and Thompson from a Kennaway novel, The Cost of Living Like This, but it was never made.

References

Bibliography
 Steve Chibnall. J. Lee Thompson. Manchester University Press, 2000.

External links

 
Country Dance at TCMDB

1970 films
1970 drama films
Films based on British novels
Films directed by J. Lee Thompson
Films scored by John Addison
Incest in film
British drama films
Metro-Goldwyn-Mayer films
1970s English-language films
1970s British films